The Screen Actors Guild Award is an accolade given by the Screen Actors Guild‐American Federation of Television and Radio Artists (SAG-AFTRA) to recognize outstanding performances in film and primetime television. In 2014, Netflix earned its first two nominations. The following year the network won three awards, Outstanding Performance by an Ensemble in a Comedy Series for Orange Is the New Black, Outstanding Performance by a Male Actor in a Drama Series for Kevin Spacey from House of Cards and Outstanding Performance by a Female Actor in a Comedy Series for Orange Is the New Blacks Uzo Aduba. In 2016, all three winners repeated. In addition, Idris Elba won for Outstanding Performance by Male Actor in a Supporting Role for the film Beasts of No Nation. During the 2017 ceremony, The Crown won for performances of Claire Foy and John Lithgow, Stranger Things won for Outstanding Performance by an Ensemble in a Drama Series and Orange Is the New Black won for a third year in a row Outstanding Performance by an Ensemble in a Comedy Series.

Performance by an Ensemble

Ensemble in a Drama Series

Ensemble in a Comedy Series

Stunt Ensemble in a Television Series

Cast in a Motion Picture

Stunt Ensemble in a Motion Picture

Performances in Television

Male Actor in a Drama Series

Female Actor in a Drama Series

Male Actor in a Comedy Series

Female Actor in a Comedy Series

Male Actor in a Miniseries or Television Movie

Female Actor in a Miniseries or Television Movie

Performances in Film

Male Actor in a Leading Role

Female Actor in a Leading Role

Male Actor in a Supporting Role

Female Actor in a Supporting Role

See also
Main
 List of accolades received by Netflix

Others
 List of TCA Awards received by Netflix
 List of BAFTA Awards received by Netflix
 List of Golden Globe Awards received by Netflix
 List of Critics' Choice Awards received by Netflix
 List of Daytime Emmy Awards received by Netflix
 List of Primetime Emmy Awards received by Netflix
 List of Primetime Creative Arts Emmy Awards received by Netflix

Notes

References

Lists of accolades received by Netflix
Lists of television series by network